The 2000 Cork Intermediate Hurling Championship was the 91st staging of the Cork Intermediate Hurling Championship since its establishment by the Cork County Board in 1909. The draw for the opening round fixtures took place on 12 December 1999. The championship began on 6 May 2000 and ended on 22 October 2000.

On 22 October 2000, Douglas won the championship after a 3-08 to 2-04 defeat of Aghada in the final at Páirc Uí Chaoimh. It remains their only championship title in the grade.

Aghada's Richie Lewis was the championship's top scorer with 3-41.

Team changes

From Championship

Promoted to the Cork Senior Hurling Championship
 Ballincollig

To Championship

Promoted from the Cork Junior A Hurling Championship
 Bandon

Results

First round

Second round

Na Piarsaigh received a bye in this round.

Third round

Fourth round

Quarter-finals

Semi-finals

Final

Championship statistics

Top scorers

Overall

In a single game

References

Cork Intermediate Hurling Championship
Cork Intermediate Hurling Championship